Sir David Yule, 1st Baronet (4 August 1858 – 3 July 1928) was a Scottish businessman based in British India. The Oxford Dictionary of National Biography judged him "arguably the most important businessman in India" and quoted his obituary in The Times as "one of the wealthiest men, if not the wealthiest man, in the country".

Early life
David was born in Edinburgh, the son of David Yule and his wife Margaret. His father was a writer who also worked as a cashier at the Sasine Office, Register House. David was educated in Britain and went into the family business, which was trade with India, then the "jewel in the crown" of the British Empire.

Career

David joined Andrew Yule and Company, a conglomerate with diversified interests, which was founded by both his uncles, Andrew Yule and George Yule. The principal business of the company was the export of jute fiber. Over time the Yules became progressively integrated in India from plantation to textile mills.

His uncle George died childless in 1892. His uncle Andrew had a daughter, Annie Henrietta, whom David married in 1900. Andrew died in 1902 and at this point, the entire Yule conglomerate came under David's control.

In 1919, David Yule and Thomas Catto, 1st Baron Catto formed Yule Catto and Company Ltd, which is now known as Synthomer and is listed on the London Stock Exchange. Among his other business interests were directorships of Midland Bank, Mercantile Bank of India, Vickers Limited, the Royal Exchange Assurance Company and ownership of the Daily Chronicle newspaper, which he purchased from Lloyd George.

David Yule was knighted by King George V in India on 4 January 1912 and was created a baronet, of Hugli River in Calcutta, on 30 January 1922. He died on 3 July 1928. His baronetcy lapsed at his death for lack of an heir.

The New York Times reported that his daughter inherited $100 000 000 on his death, equivalent to $1.6 billion in 2022 money.

Personal life
David and Annie Yule had one child, a daughter called Gladys Yule (1903–1957). In 1925, they commissioned as their family home Hanstead House in Bricket Wood, Hertfordshire. Here, the two women set up a very successful horse breeding farm for the Arabian breed, known as the Hanstead Stud.
Descendants of the Yule family are still alive today in England.

References

External links
 at the Yule Family website
Andrew Yule & Co Ltd
Yule Catto & Co plc

Businesspeople from Edinburgh
1858 births
1928 deaths
Baronets in the Baronetage of the United Kingdom
Scottish knights
Indian baronets
People from Kolkata
19th-century Scottish businesspeople
19th-century Indian businesspeople
David